Nonant-le-Pin is a commune in the Orne department in north-western France.

See also
Communes of the Orne department

Notable residents
 Marie Duplessis

References

Nonantlepin